Bądkowo  is a village in Aleksandrów County, Kuyavian-Pomeranian Voivodeship, in north-central Poland. It is the seat of the gmina (administrative district) called Gmina Bądkowo.

References

Villages in Aleksandrów County
Warsaw Governorate
Warsaw Voivodeship (1919–1939)
Pomeranian Voivodeship (1919–1939)